National Route 383 is a national highway of Japan connecting Hirado, Nagasaki and Imari, Saga in Japan, with a total length of 75.8 km (47.1 mi).

References

National highways in Japan
Roads in Nagasaki Prefecture
Roads in Saga Prefecture